Oceanobacillus kimchii is a bacterium, named after kimchi, where the first isolate was found. Its cells are rod-shaped and the type strain is X50T (=JCM 16803T =KACC 14914T =DSM 23341T). Oceanobacillus kimchii is also found in the marine sponges.

Characteristics of Oceanobacillus kimchii 
S.I. Paul et al. (2021) isolated and identified Oceanobacillus kimchii (strains ISP152A, ISP172B, and KSP141C) from marine sponges of the Saint Martin's Island Area of the Bay of Bengal, Bangladesh. Colony, morphological, physiological, and biochemical characteristics of Oceanobacillus kimchii are shown in the Table below.

Note: + = Positive, – =Negative

References

Further reading
Staley, James T., et al. "Bergey's manual of systematic bacteriology, vol. 3."Williams and Wilkins, Baltimore, MD (1989): 2250–2251.

External links

LPSN
Type strain of Oceanobacillus kimchii at BacDive -  the Bacterial Diversity Metadatabase

Bacillaceae